Rasmus Johannes Mork (19 January 1896 – 23 May 1974) was a Norwegian economist and administrator.

He took the cand.oecon. degree in 1920, lectured at Norges landbrukshøgskole from 1921, was appointed professor of dairy economics from 1945 to 1962, and served as rector from 1946 to 1953. He was a member of the Administrative Council in 1940, as head of the Ministry of Agriculture and Food. He was decorated Commander of the Order of St. Olav in 1951. He died in 1974.

References

1896 births
1974 deaths
People from Ørsta
Norwegian people of World War II
Norwegian economists
University of Oslo alumni
Academic staff of the Norwegian College of Agriculture
Rectors of the Norwegian University of Life Sciences
Commanders Crosses of the Order of Merit of the Federal Republic of Germany